Nicholas Owen may refer to:

 Nicholas Owen (Jesuit) (c.1562–1606), one of the Forty Martyrs of England and Wales
 Nicholas Owen (priest) (1752–1811), Welsh Anglican priest and antiquarian
 Nicholas Owen (journalist) (born 1947), BBC news presenter
 Nick Owen (born 1947), presenter for Midlands Today
 Nicholas Bond-Owen (born 1968), child actor of the 1970s and 80s